Une famille formidable (English: A Wonderful Family, literal English title: A marvelous family) is a French romantic comedy television series broadcast since 17 September 1992. It details the goings on of a family, and follows them as they grow up. As of 2008, the cast is the same as the 1992 cast, an unusual feat for a program with a run of this length.

In 2012, during the broadcast of the season 9, twenty years of the series are celebrated.

In 2017, during the broadcast of the season 14, twenty-five years of the series are celebrated.

Cast members

Main cast

Recurring cast

Guest

External links
 Program site at TV7

French television sitcoms
1992 French television series debuts
Romantic comedy television series